Alv Gjestvang (13 September 1937 − 26 November 2016) was a Norwegian speed skater and Olympic medalist, born in Østre Toten. He received a bronze medal at the 1956 Winter Olympics in Cortina d'Ampezzo, and a silver medal at the 1964 Winter Olympics in Innsbruck.

He represented the speed skating clubs Skreia IL, Oslo IL and Hamar IL through his career. Gjestvang died from cancer 26 November 2016.  He was 79.

References

External links

1937 births
2016 deaths
People from Østre Toten
Norwegian male speed skaters
Olympic speed skaters of Norway
Speed skaters at the 1956 Winter Olympics
Speed skaters at the 1960 Winter Olympics
Speed skaters at the 1964 Winter Olympics
Olympic silver medalists for Norway
Olympic bronze medalists for Norway
Olympic medalists in speed skating
Medalists at the 1956 Winter Olympics
Medalists at the 1964 Winter Olympics
Sportspeople from Innlandet